The 1968 Winter Olympics, officially known as the X Olympic Winter Games, was a winter multi-sport event held in Grenoble, France, from 6 to 18 February 1968. A total of 1,158 athletes representing 37 National Olympic Committees (NOCs)—including Morocco's first delegation—participated in 35 events from 10 different sports and disciplines. The team relay (4 × 7.5 km) event in biathlon was contested for the first time.

Fifteen NOCs won at least one medal, and thirteen of them secured at least one gold. For the first time, after three consecutive editions of the Winter Olympics, the Soviet Union did not finish first in the overall and gold medal counts.
Having won a total of thirteen medals, of which five were gold, they came second to Norway, whose athletes took home fourteen medals (six golds, six silvers, and two bronzes). This was Norway's comeback to the top spot of both medal rankings, after the 1952 Winter Olympics, and the sixth time since the nation first competed at the inaugural 1924 Winter Games.
The host team, France, concluded its participation with a set of nine medals: four golds (tied with Italy), three silvers, and two bronzes. Eight of these medals were obtained in alpine skiing events, and three of the four French Olympic titles were won by a single alpine skier, Jean-Claude Killy, who swept the men's events.

East and West Germany entered separate teams for the first time, ending a run of three straight editions (1956–1964) in which German athletes participated as a single team. Victories by Thomas Köhler and Klaus-Michael Bonsack (luge doubles), and by Franz Keller (Nordic combined), resulted in the first Winter Olympics gold medal for East and West Germany, respectively.
Czechoslovakia also got its first-ever gold at the Winter Games, thanks to a successful combination of ski jumps by Jiří Raška in the normal hill (70 m) event. Raška also secured a silver medal in the large hill (90 m) event, after becoming one of the first Olympic ski jumpers to cross the 100-metre mark. Czechoslovak athletes collected a second silver, in ice hockey, and a bronze, in figure skating, helping the nation to achieve its best result in the Winter Olympics, at that time.
In Grenoble, Romania won its first and so far only medal at the Winter Games, as Ion Panţuru and Nicolae Neagoe secured the bronze in bobsleigh's two-man event. 
Toini Gustafsson, a Swedish cross-country skier, contributed three of her NOC's eight medals, including two of its three golds, with victories in both women's individual events and a runner-up place in the team relay.
Half of Italy's four gold medals were obtained by nine-time bobsleigh world champion Eugenio Monti, who finally drove his sled to the Olympic two- and four-man titles, after two silvers in Cortina d'Ampezzo 1956 and two bronzes in Innsbruck 1964.
Canada collected three medals, of which two were won by alpine skier Nancy Greene (gold in women's giant slalom and silver in women's slalom).
All nine medals secured by athletes of the Dutch delegation were in speed skating events.


Medal table

The medal table is based on information provided by the International Olympic Committee (IOC) and is consistent with IOC convention in its published medal tables. By default, the table is ordered by the number of gold medals won by an NOC. The number of silver medals is taken into consideration next and then the number of bronze medals. If nations are still tied, equal ranking is given and they are listed alphabetically.

In speed skating, ties for the second place in the men's 500 m, 1,500 m, and women's 500 m events resulted in the awarding of an additional four silver medals; as a consequence, three bronzes were not presented. This explains the uneven number of total gold (35), silver (39), and bronze (32) medals distributed in these Games.

Notes
 The Soviet Union began competing at the Winter Games in 1956, and until 1968, it always lead the gold and total medal categories.
 Norway's previous medal table leads occurred in 1924, 1928, 1936, 1948 (shared with Sweden), and 1952.

See also
1968 Summer Olympics medal table

References

External links
 
 
 

Medal tables
1968